Joachim Carlos Martini (4 May 1931 – 29 November 2015) was a Chilean-born German conductor.

He founded the Junge Kantorei and the Frankfurt Baroque Orchestra, both of which are known for their performances of Handel's works. Under his direction, 20 recordings have been published. He also founded an archive dealing with music under Nazism and published a book on the history of Jewish musicians in Frankfurt during the Nazi period.

References

1931 births
German conductors (music)
German male conductors (music)
2015 deaths